

Launch statistics

Rocket configurations

Launch sites

Launch outcomes

1960

1961

1962

1963

1964

1965

1966

1967

1968

1969

References

Main Page
List of Atlas launches

Atlas